Khoro (Xoro) is a rural locality (a selo), the only inhabited locality, and the administrative center of Khorinsky Rural Okrug of Verkhnevilyuysky District in the Sakha Republic, Russia, located  from Verkhnevilyuysk, the administrative center of the district. Its population as of the 2010 Census was 1,221, up from 1,131 recorded during the 2002 Census.

History
According to the legend, the area of modern Khoro was settled by the Khoro tribes from the Lena basin, who fled to this area to escape their Yakut oppressors. A locality here was first mentioned in written sources in connection with the annexation of Yakutia by the Russian Empire. In 1634, Russian Cossacks, headed by Voin Shakhov, established a winter settlement at the confluence of the Vilyuy and Tyukyan rivers. This settlement served as the seat of administration of the surrounding area for several decades, after which it was moved to the Yolyonnyokh area  down by the Vilyuy River, where the ostrog (fortified settlement) of Olensk (now Vilyuysk) was founded in 1773.

Modern Khoro was established in 1952 by merging four neighboring kolkhozes. Until 2003, the official name of the village was Bulgunnyakhtakh; named so after the post office.

References

Notes

Sources
Official website of the Sakha Republic. Registry of the Administrative-Territorial Divisions of the Sakha Republic. Verkhnevilyuysky District. 

Rural localities in Verkhnevilyuysky District
